Planète+ Thalassa was a French TV channel, owned by Canal+ Group & France Télévisions. It is part of Planète+ channels. The channel has stopped on 1 January 2016 after that France Télévisions and the CANAL+ Group agreed to close the channel.

History 
On 15 September 1999 the channel was launched with the name of Planète 2.

On July 2002, Canal+ Group and France Télévisions signed a contract for the launch of a TV channel, showing programs based upon the famous French program Thalassa, which has been broadcast on France 3 since 1975 . This new channel replaced Planète 2 on 1 November 2002.

Because of the addition of + letter on Canal+'s thematic channels, Planète Thalassa became Planète+ Thalassa on 17 May 2011 as well as the other Planète + channels.

The channel closed his gates on the 1st day of 2016. It is because of the Découverte (Discovery) thematic too strong that CANAL+ & France Télévisions decided together to close the channel. The CANALSAT (now known as CANAL) subscribers can still watch the other Planète + channels from channel 80 to 83.

Television stations in France
Defunct television channels in France
MultiThématiques
Television channels and stations established in 1999
Television channels and stations disestablished in 2016
1999 establishments in France